Burgos is a municipality located in the Mexican state of Tamaulipas.

History 
On February 20, 1749, the captain José Antonio Leal de León y Guerra founded the village of Nuestra Señora de Loreto de Burgos, populated mainly with families from  Linares.

External links
Gobierno Municipal de Burgos Official website

Municipalities of Tamaulipas